Gaos may refer to:

 Geneva Amateur Operatic Society, a society based in Geneva
 Gyaos (ギャオス, Gyaosu, or Gaos), several monsters from Daiei's Gamera film series
 José Gaos (1900–1969), Spanish-born philosopher
 Lola Gaos (1921–1993), Spanish film, television and theatre actress
 Vicente Gaos (1919–1980), Spanish poet and essayist

See also
 Gao (disambiguation)